The following is a list of fictional United States presidents, C through D.

C

President Billy Cabot
 President in: The Accidental Time Machine
 In 2180 President Cabot is the first human to witness the Second Coming. Jesus shows up in the Oval Office, anoints the President as his First Bishop and tasks him to proselytize the rest of the nation, which sets off the One Year War. The Army of the Lord, made of Christers who accept the President's visitor as being the returned Jesus, fight the Doubters, who suspect this visitor of being nothing but a hoax. Over the course of the war, New York City, the eastern third of New York State, Miami, Atlanta, large parts of Maryland and Virginia, and various other locations are destroyed. After about half the population on the East Coast is killed and the situation is stabilizes: the United States government, headed by the President-Bishop and with Jesus making frequent appearances and performing various miracles, remains in control of the Eastern Seaboard and cuts itself off completely from the seceding Godless states to its west, known collectively as "Gommorrah" or "Holywood".

President Jack Cahill
 President in: Chain of Command
 Played by: Roy Scheider

President Patricia Caldwell
 President in: Tom Clancy's Splinter Cell: Conviction
 Succeeds David Bowers, who was president in the previous Splinter Cell installments.
 An assassination attempt is made on her life by corrupt elements of Third Echelon, a sub-agency of the NSA. She is rescued by rogue agent Sam Fisher.
 She orders the termination of Third Echelon and authorizes the launch of Fourth Echelon under the direction of Fisher.
 She leads the nation's campaign to counter "The Blackist", a series of coordinated terrorist attacks planned against the United States aimed to end America's overseas military presence worldwide.
 She is re-elected to a second term of office.
 Party: Democratic

President Gary Callahan
 President in: Transmetropolitan
 He is arrested for murder while in office.
 Also known as "The Smiler".

President Dwayne Elizondo Mountain Dew Herbert Camacho
 President in: Idiocracy
 President in the year 2505.
 He is formerly a professional wrestler and pornographic actor. His presidency is plagued with rampant famine, dust storms, and the collapse of the Brawndo company.
 Played by Terry Crews

President Ted Campbell
 President in: Y: The Last Man (TV series)
 The incumbent president who died in a cataclysmic event which simultaneously killed all mammals with a Y chromosome except for escape artist Yorick Brown and his pet monkey Ampersand.
 Prior to the event, he had ordered the Culper Ring operative Agent 355 to kill a white supremacist terrorist cell, and had been criticised by the Chair of the House Intelligence Committee Chair (and his eventual successor) Jennifer Brown for not backing a bill that would have permitted social media sites to permanently ban white supremacists.
 His daughter Kimberly Campbell Cunningham, a right-wing author and unofficial advisor, leads a cabal who, in part, wish to remove the newly sworn-in Democrat Brown as president in order to restore the influence they had under the Campbell administration.
 Party: Republican
 Played by Paul Gross

President Steven Mariano Capatelli
 President in: Il Presidente by S.D. Weaver (short story series)
 He is appointed vice president-elect by President-Elect William Harris on January 8, 2017, after Vice President Elect Dana Merril is forced to quit prior to her formal swearing-in on January 20.
 Becomes President at 5:13 PM, January 20, 2017, after Harris kills himself in the Oval Office earlier that day.
 Catholic; his uncle was a cardinal in the Catholic Church.
Party: Democratic
 Was a medical researcher and hospital administrator prior to appointment.

President Jennifer Capper
 President in: Kingdom Come by Elliot S. Maggin (based on the comic book miniseries of the same name by Mark Waid and Alex Ross)
 She is elected president without actively running.
 Serves term during a nuclear disaster caused by a clash of superhumans in Kansas.
 Party: New Federalist.

President James (Jim) Carlisle
 President in: Guarding Tess
 Former governor and US senator from Ohio who is elected to the White House in the late 1980s, and dies in office. His widow Tess is kidnapped and later rescued by a Secret Service agent.
 Played by: George Gomes

President Carlson
 President in: Executive Target (1997 film)
 Running for re-election; wants to cut defense spending and Star Wars and reinvest the money in health care and education. 
 Played by: Roy Scheider

President Carmody
 President in I, Martha Adams by Pauline Glen Winslow (1982 novel).
 Carmody is elected president after President Reagan and Vice President Bush are assassinated in a bombing.
 Cuts back defense in an effort to appease the Soviet Union, and surrenders to it after a Counterforce Attack destroys the bulk of the U.S. Nuclear Deterrent.
 Forced to resign by Soviets in favor of Vice President Bristol.

President Francis T. Carroll
 Former president in Letter 44 (comic book series, 2013–)
 43rd President of the United States (caricature of George W. Bush).

President Quinton Carroway
 President in: Quantum Night
 Party: Republican; fictionalized amalgamation of several politicians, primarily then-candidate Donald Trump.
 Enforces Islamophobic policies and expands US security apparatus.
 Orders the invasion of Canada in response to Naheed Nenshi becoming Prime Minister of Canada.

President Carson
 President in: The Last Centurion
 Defeats incumbent President Warrick (Democrat) after her mental breakdown.
Party: Republican

President Benito Caruso
 President in: The Shape of Things to Come
Serves from 1956 to 1962 though his term had expired, because his successor-elect disappears in the Allegheny Mountains on his way to the capital.
 His authority in practice is restricted to the environs of Washington D.C., because the US disintegrated from the failure of the New Deal and the decades-long continuation and deepening of the 1929 economic crisis.
 Caruso is mentioned among the statesmen from different countries ineffectively trying to negotiate an end to the European war of the 1940s (in which the US did not get involved).

President Dirk Morganthal Cassidy
 President in: The Agent from UNLESS by Cassandra Harbinger.
 Former U.S. Senator from Connecticut.
 Cousin of the superheroine Columbia (Commander Jennifer Cassidy Young, USN).
 Assassinated in Nashville, Tennessee.
 Party: Liberty Party.

President James Cassidy
 President in: The Greek Tycoon
 Cassidy is a representation of John F. Kennedy.

President John Trelawney Cassidy
 President in: Promises to Keep by George Bernau (novel)
 Cassidy is a roman à clef representation of John F. Kennedy. The novel assumes an alternate history in which Cassidy survives a November 1963 assassination attempt.
 Cassidy spends the remaining fourteen months of his term recovering from gunshot wounds and does not run for re-election in 1964. He allows his vice president, Ransom W. Gardner, to run in his place, on the condition that Gardner names his brother, Attorney General Tim Cassidy, as vice president. John Cassidy runs for and wins the 1964 election as senator from New York.
 After Tim Cassidy is killed in Vietnam, John Cassidy challenges Gardner for the Democratic nomination in 1968.
 Cassidy survives a second assassination attempt in Los Angeles and is elected the 37th President of the United States.

President Samuel Adams Castilla
 President in: Covert-One by several authors (based on unpublished material from Robert Ludlum)
 Early in his presidency, Castilla authorizes the creation of a top-secret US agency named Covert-One.

President Castilla
 President in Covert One: The Hades Factor
 Unlike in the book, President Castilla is female in the movies
 Played by Anjelica Huston

President Benjamin Castillo
 President in: The Unit
 First Hispanic president.
 While still President-Elect, he falls victim to a day of widespread terrorist attacks on the executive branch in the episode "Sacrifice". The attacks claim the lives of incumbent Vice President Charles Horton while on a visit to Rome and Castillo's running mate.
 He is attacked in a motorcade attacked by terrorists in Cascade, Colorado, while en route to Colorado Springs Airport. Castillo is able to escape, flanked by two surviving Secret Service agents who are later killed. He is pursued through the Colorado countryside by the terrorists, who are disguised as members of the Colorado Army National Guard. He is later rescued by Delta Force operatives and returned to safety, with the news of the attack on his motorcade being censored from the public to prevent widespread national panic. The assassination of his running mate is blamed on an accidental gas leak for the same reason.
 Later appears as president, in "The Last Nazi", where he orders the Delta Force team to track down a surviving Schutzstaffel officer in Switzerland and bring him to The Hague to prevent private operatives working for his close friend and donor (a survivor of the Holocaust whose family was killed by the man) from killing him. 
 Also appears in "Unknown Soldier", where he orders the unit to track down and defuse a set of dirty bombs bound for various cities across the United States. 
 Secret Service codename: Spinnaker
 Portrayed by: Benito Martinez

President Janice Castleman
 President in: Remnants
 First female and African-American president.
 She is killed during the asteroid collision along with virtually everyone else on Earth.

President Chadbourne
 President in: Wolves of the Calla
Chadbourne appears on the ten dollar bill in an alternate reality.

President Chambers
 President in: Long Shot
 Actor known for playing a fictional president on a television show before being elected in 2016.
 He chooses not to run for re-election in 2020 to pursue a career in film.
 Term: 2017–2021
 Portrayed by: Bob Odenkirk

President Samuel Chambers
 President in: The Survivalist
Former Secretary of Communications before becoming president after the incumbent president commits suicide rather than surrender to the Soviets at the start of a nuclear war.

President Harrison Chandler
 President in: Amazon Women on the Moon

President William Chandler
 President in: Hitler's Daughter by Timothy Benford.
 Two-term president.

President Charles
 President in: Jericho
 As Secretary of Health and Human Services, Charles is next in line of succession after most members of the US government are killed in a series of nuclear attacks on two dozen American cities.
 In the aftermath of the attacks, Charles' claim to the presidency is challenged by five other surviving government officials (mostly members of the US Senate). His administration manages to regain control over all US territory east of the Mississippi with Columbus, Ohio, as the new capital. However, two newly emerged governments refuse to recognize the administration: the Allied States of America (led by former Wyoming senator John Tomarchio) and an independent Texas.

President Andrew Chase
 President in: First Ladies
 Lucy, Chase's granddaughter, looks at his picture for inspiration while trying to get her husband the presidency.

President Arthur Christensen
 President in: The Double Man by Gary Hart and William Cohen (1984 novel).
 President Christensen approves of a plan to allow a U.S. Senator to be kidnapped and framed for treason.

President Thomas Christian
 President in: Too Close to Home
 Has an affair with the show's protagonist, Anna Hayes.
 Played by: Matt Battaglia

Acting President Sam Clark
 President in: Shelley's Heart by Charles McCarry (1995 novel)
 Former Senator from Massachusetts who is chosen to be vice president by President R. Tucker Attenborough.
 Appointed as vice president in less than a day, and then takes over as acting President due to Attenborough's failing health under the 25th Amendment.
 Party: Democratic

President Ralph Clark
 President in: The Coup Scenario by John Rogerson (2010 novel)
 A former senator from North Carolina, Clark is elected president in 2016 with Governor Anne Mitchell of Texas as his running mate.
 Throughout his first term, Clark focuses on cutting the national debt, reforming immigration, and social security. He also pushes a Middle East peace plan. His foreign policy agenda makes him unpopular among the intelligence community, especially with Secretary of State Stephen Cox, a former CIA director.
 He is re-elected in 2020. At the start of his second term, he discovers Secretary Cox had been covertly trying to sabotage the Tehran Summit, where the West and Middle East would sign a crucial diplomatic agreement between Israel and Iran, and tells Cox that upon the completion of the summit, he would dismiss him as Secretary of State.
 Cox uses agents loyal to him to smuggle a bomb aboard Air Force One, planting it amongst the fuselage and letting it detonate during the president's flight to Tehran, killing Clark and everyone on board.
Clark is succeeded as by Vice President Mitchell
 Party: Republican

President Ellen Claremont
 President in: Red, White & Royal Blue
Claremont is from Texas and served in the U.S. House of Representatives. She was Speaker of the House. She is elected President in 2016 with Senator Mike Holleran of Vermont as her running mate. She is re-elected in 2020, in which Senator Jeffrey Richards of Utah is her major opponent.
 Her First Gentleman, Leo Castalazzi, is her second husband. She was previously married to Senator Oscar Diaz of California, who is the father of her children.
 Claremont and her team craft the public persona of the White House Trio for her daughter June, son Alex, and Holleran's granddaughter Nora so they would have greater control over how the public perceived them.
 Party: Democratic

President David Coffey
 President in: Footfall

President Cole
 President in: Read or Die and R.O.D the TV
 Seen as clumsy, bumbling, and cowardly, urinating in his pants when terrified.

President Robert Colonby
 President in The Eclipse of Dawn (1971) by Gordon Eklund
 Runs for president in 1988 after the US collapsed in The Second Civil War and the White House was moved from ruined Washington, D.C., to California. He reunites the nation with extraterrestrial help from Jupiter. He is revealed to be a murderer . but the narrator considers him to be "The Best Man for the Nation".

President Monroe "Eagle" Cole
 President in: Welcome to Mooseport
 Native of Mooseport, Maine, Cole serves two terms as president and attempts to run for mayor of Mooseport after his presidency. Is the first president to divorce his wife while in office.
 Played by: Gene Hackman
 Party: Democratic

President Alex Coleman
 President in: .hack
 Succeeds President Jim Stonecold, who resigns after the Pluto's Kiss incident.
 Announces the "Network Peace Proclamation" to the world on December 14, 2007, exactly three years after the Pluto's Kiss incident destroyed the modern internet.

President Fred Collier
 President in: Political Animals
 Before entering politics, Collier served for three decades with the CIA and became the agency's director. He is selected as the Democratic vice presidential candidate by Senator Paul Garcetti, as Collier has influence over the party's conservative wing, whose votes Garcetti needs.
 Upon taking office, Collier fights with Secretary of State Elaine Barrish, whom he resented for having more influence in government than he did.
 In late 2010, Collier blackmails Republican Congressman Sean Reeves into backing an administration bill after he procured evidence of Reeves's closeted homosexuality and affair with Barrish's son, T.J Hammond, which indirectly leads to T.J attempting suicide and T.J's father, former President Bud Hammond, punching Collier in the Oval Office upon learning of Collier's blackmail.
 Collier is to be dropped as vice president by Garcetti after the latter learns of the blackmail, but Garcetti dies when Air Force One crashes due to a technical fault in mid-2011, leaving Collier as Acting President and then President after Garcetti's corpse was found in the wreckage.
 Term: July 2011 onwards
 Party: Democratic
 Played by: Dylan Baker

President Angela Colloton
 President in: Shadowrun
 Serves from 2069 to 2078
 11th UCAS President | 57th US President
 Party: Republican
 Succeeds President Gene Simone

President Deklan Comstock/President Julian Comstock
 Presidents in: Julian Comstock: A Story of 22nd-Century America and Julian: A Christmas Story
 In 2172 Deklan Comstock, a repressive and dictatorial hereditary president assassinates his brother, but his Liberal nephew Julian escapes. Julian Comstock overthrows his uncle and embark on democratic reforms, but is overthrown and assassinated by the reactionary armed forces and official church.

President Billy Connor
 President in: The Spike
An ultra-liberal former Congressman from Mississippi, he is oblivious to a Soviet plot to overthrow the Saudi monarchy and cut off Mideast oil to the West.

President David Connor
 President in: Triumph by Philip Wylie (1963 novel)
 President Connor is killed along with his family while being evacuated from Washington, D.C. during a nuclear attack.

President Samuel Conrad
 President in: Act of War and Edge of Battle by Tom Clancy
 Declares war against global terrorism after a nuclear attack in Houston and attempted nuke in San Francisco.
 Survives a terrorist attack and invasion of White House.

President Hamilton Conroy
 President in: Coyote
 Conroy is purportedly a descendant of Alexander Hamilton and is the President of the United Republic of America, an extreme right-wing reorganization of the United States of America where New England and the Pacific Northwest have seceded and become sovereign nations, at least up until 2070.
 A former Congressman from Alabama, he is instrumental in getting Operation Starflight, the first crewed deep-space mission to colonize 47 Ursae Majoris, up and running.
 Party: Liberty Party, an ultra-right-wing neoconservative party

President Edward Randolph Cooper
 President in: Scandal
 Serves as the 40th president, whose popular conservative leadership influences the policies of his Republican successors.
 Married to First Lady Bitsy Cooper, but has a string of affairs while in office.
 Secretly suffers from diagnosed ADHD, requiring his wife to essentially run the nation and provide him with guidance out of the public eye.
Survived an assassination attempt in 1986 perpetrated by Leonard Carnahan, who shot him whilst he was campaigning in Stockton, California.
 Although he survived the attempt on his life, the bullet remained in his head as it was too dangerous for medical staff to remove it. Cooper dies in 2014 of a stroke caused by complications from the injury.
 Political party: Republican

President Will "Chewey" Cooper
 President in: Pixels
 He is an initially unpopular president whose popularity surges when his childhood friend, Sam Brenner (Adam Sandler), helps defend the world against aliens. 
 He is an expert at the crane game, which comes in handy to defeat the alien invaders.
 Played by: Kevin James

President Joseph Copeland
 President in: Mobile Suit Gundam SEED Destiny
 Voiced by: Taiten Kusunoki
 President of the superstate successor of the United States

President Tad Copeland
 President in: the novels of Guillaume Musso
 A university professor from Philadelphia, moderate Republican, former governor of Pennsylvania
 Plays a major role in Mussos book Brooklyn Girl, where he is on track to win the Republican primary against Donald Trump and Ted Cruz
 Has an extra-marital affair with an African-American woman, Joyce Carlyle, and an illegitimate child with her, Claire Carlyle, the later fiancée of the books protagonist, Raphael Barthelemy.
 While trying to convince Joyce to keep their affair a secret because his presidential campaign would be endangered, the two get into an argument in which he accidentally kills her
 In the following novel by Musso, An apartment in Paris, he wins the election but is poorly received.

President Cord
 President in: Stealth Bomber by Barnaby Williams (1990 novel)
 Believing that Cord's defense policy would be beneficial to the Soviet Union during the Cold War, the Soviets manipulate a presidential election to have Cord elected. Their plot is exposed when Iran tries to start World War Three.

President John J. Cormack
 President in: The Negotiator

President Guy "Whitey" Corngood
 President in: Mr. Show with Bob and David
 Played by: Jay Johnston

President Daniel Cox
President in: First Family by David Baldacci

President Daniel Keem
President in: Hunt Down the Freeman by Royal Rudius Entertainment (video game)
Played by: Daniel Keem/DJ Killer Keemstar

President William A. Cozzano
 President in: Interface 
He is assassinated on his inauguration day and succeeded by Vice President Eleanor Richmond

President Calvin Craig
 President in: Assassination
 Played by: Charles Howerton

President Stanley Craig
 President in: The President Vanishes
 Played by: Arthur Byron

President Hugh Crane
 President in: Schrödinger's Cat Trilogy
 Succeeds President Carter upon his death.

President Benjamin Edgar Cross
 President in: HaShminiya and the Samurai Night Adventures

President Mary Alice "Muffy" Crosswire
 President in: "The Election" (Arthur) She is being sworn in as President before Arthur Read calls out to Muffy.
Played by: Melissa Altro

President Andrew Y. Culpepper
 President in: Moonfall by Jack McDevitt
 First African-American president and the oldest elected president
 Is elected to office in 2008 and re-elected in 2012.
 Opens his presidential library in 2019.
 Dies in his sleep in 2021 at the age of 91.
 Party: Democratic

President John Robert Culpepper
President in: I, Q 
He is a mentioned in the first book (I, Q: Independence Hall)
He is a minor character in the second book (I, Q: The White House), where he risks his position to keep the cover of a spy attempting to take down a terrorist organization.

President George Cunningham
 President in: The Cassandra Project by Jack McDevitt and Mike Resnick
 Middle East combat veteran.
 Is elected to office in 2016.
 Struggles to deal with multiple crises, including population growth, the impending availability of life expectancy extension, two wars in Africa and the revelation of a cover-up about the early Apollo moon missions.

President William Arthur Curry
 President in: The Company by John Ehrlichman (novel), adapted as Washington: Behind Closed Doors.
 Curry is a roman à clef representation of John F. Kennedy.
 Is elected Governor of New York before appointing himself to a vacant US Senate seat two years later.
 Wins the nomination from Senator Esker Scott Anderson of Oregon and asks him to be his vice presidential running mate.
 Defeats Republican James Dudley and his running mate, Illinois Senator Richard Monckton.
 Allows a CIA plan to aid an exile invasion of the Dominican Republic, but orders an assassination calculated to make the invasion fail.
 In September of his second year in office, he flies from Albany to meet his wife Jenna at Camp David, when a private plane accidentally collides with Air Force One, killing everyone on board.
 Party: Democratic

President John Curtin
 President in: Logan's Run
 Overweight and the father of several children, President Curtin in the year 2000 advocated a one-child policy to deal with overpopulation. The resulting protest led to a nuclear war.

President Curtis
 President in: Rick and Morty
 Commonly known simply as the President, President Curtis shares a love–hate relationship with Rick Sanchez, often alternating between calling upon him and his grandson Morty Smith to protect America and the world from various threats, to attempting to have him arrested or killed. Introduced in the second season episode "Get Schwifty", the President is voiced by Keith David.

President Johnny Cyclops
 President in: Whoops Apocalypse
 A recently lobotomized former screen actor, who is hated at home and desperate to regain popularity. With other world leaders, he starts World War III, resulting in a nuclear holocaust.
 Played by: Barry Morse
 Party: Republican

D

President Jack D'Amici
 President in: the novels of Jim DeFelice

President James Dale
 President in: Mars Attacks!
 During Dale's re-election campaign, Earth makes contact with aliens, and he is killed shortly after contact.
 Played by: Jack Nicholson

President Joan Dale
 President in: Reign of the Supermen
 In a world where Superman died fighting Doomsday, President Joan Dale is protected by the Justice League.
 She was previously the superheroine Miss America.
 Voiced by: Jennifer Hale

President Taffy Dale
 Acting President in: Mars Attacks!
 Daughter of President James Dale
 Effectively becomes president after the entire United States presidential line of succession is wiped out by invading aliens and survivors look to her for leadership.
 Played by: Natalie Portman

President Chauncey Talcott Dallas
 Incumbent in: The Gentleman from California by Niven Busch

President Conrad Dalton
 President in: Madam Secretary
 Played by: Keith Carradine
 Former Director of the Central Intelligence Agency of 12 years. 
 In his first term, IA Director Andrew Munsey, Secretary of State Vincent Marsh, and other intelligence officials plan a coup in Iran to stop the Iranian peace talks. Marsh is killed during the planning, prompting Dalton to replace him with Elizabeth McCord, a former senior CIA analyst and Georgetown professor. His administration signs a peace treaty with Iran to diffuse their nuclear weapons program in 2015 after the attempted coup fails and the Munsey conspiracy is exposed.
 In 2015 he opens relations with Cuba by lifting the trade embargo.
 Dalton initially escalates a conflict over Ukraine with new Russian President Maria Ostrova, leading to an air battle between air forces before diffusing the conflict with McCord's help. Dalton holds the peace deal with the new Russian government after Ostrova's assassination. In a further development to return a US asset (Russian military officer Dimitri Petrov) who had helped the US massively during the conflict but had been captured, Dalton authorizes a spy swap for the officer with Russian spy Peter Buckley, a former CIA officer and US traitor.
 Dalton deals with terrorist group Hizb al-Shahid, who commit terrorist attacks in the Middle East. When their members detonate a dirty bomb in Washington D.C., Dalton authorizes the formation of a top-secret intel unit to combat them including former spy Henry McCord, Elizabeth's husband.
 Dalton tries to broker peace between India and Pakistan but the talks fail due to a Pakistani nuclear bomb crash landing in India and a coup led by the Pakistani Foreign Minister to overthrow the Prime Minister of Pakistan. As a result, Dalton executes the Render Safe plan to secure nuclear missile sites in Pakistan.
 As a result of his ambitious, successful peace deals with Iran and Cuba, as well as the Hizb al-Shahid attack in Washington D.C. and the Buckley Trade, Dalton is challenged for the Republican party nomination in 2016 by Pennsylvania Governor Sam Evans. Although he initially led Evans in the primary polls, a radical shift on foreign policy to include acceptance of climate change as a national security issue, the changing of alliances in the Middle East, and Dalton's earlier foreign policy achievements allow Evans to portray Dalton as soft on defense to the Republican base and win the party nomination over Dalton.
 Faced with being only the second President in US history to lose his party nomination for a second term (after Franklin Pierce in 1856), Dalton is convinced by Secretary McCord and Chief of Staff Russell Jackson to run in the general election as an independent candidate to preserve his legacy and stop Evans and isolationist Democratic nominee Fred Reynolds's actions.
 Party: Independent

President Danny Daniels
 President in: Steve Berry's Cotton Malone series of novels.
 Fictionally assumed to have been elected in 2004 and re-elected in 2008 in an alternate timeline where George W. Bush's second term and Barack Obama's first term do not happen.

President Eliot Daniels
 President in: The Russian Woman by Tom Hyman (1983 novel).
 Survives an attack on his motorcade in which the Soviet Premier is killed.
 His wife is mentally ill, and he falls in love with a Russian woman, a spy for the KGB.
 Seriously injured during a fire at the White House.

President Noah Daniels
 President in: 24 (2009–2013)
 Previously served as the Governor of Tennessee (2003–2008) and as a senator from Tennessee (1977–1995)
Vice President to Wayne Palmer
 When Palmer is severely injured in an assassination attempt, Daniels takes over as Acting President.
 Palmer assumes office again for a few hours and asks for Daniels' resignation over Daniels' plan to launch a nuke at Hamri Al-Assad's country in order to stop Fayed from detonating another bomb on US soil. Palmer collapses during a press conference soon after and Daniels assumes office as Acting President.
 Serves out the rest of Palmer's term after Palmer's death and loses re-election to Allison Taylor in the 2012 presidential elections.
 Played by: Powers Boothe
 Party: Democratic

President Linda Danvers
 President in: Action Comics 344 (Dec 1966) and 345 (Jan 1967)
 Supergirl travels to an alternate reality where teenagers are in charge. While Supergirl is unpopular, Linda Danvers is elected President of the Union of American States.

President Paul Davenport
 President in: First Kid
 Played by: James Naughton

President Nadja Daviar
 President in: Shadowrun
 Serves term in 2064
 9th UCAS President | 55th US President
 Daviar succeeds President Kyle Haeffner after his death during the November 3 coup staged by The New Revolution. She declares martial law and ruthlessly stamps out the coup within 24 hours.
 She is succeeded by Senate President Pro Tempore Gene Simone after she goes missing.

President Jason Davidson
 President in: Decker
 Former U.S. Senator.
 Succeeded in office by Jack Decker
 Played by: Joe Estevez

President Jason Davidson, Jr.
 President in Decker
 Son of a U.S. president.
 Elected in 2072.
 Played by: Joe Estevez

President Floyd Davis
 President in: Cowboy Angels by Paul J. McAuley (2008 novel)
 Serves term from 1977 to 1981
 Davis continues his predecessor's policy of using the Turing Gates that allow travel to parallel dimensions to intervene in events in other Americas.
 Defeated by Jimmy Carter in the 1980 presidential election.

President Frederick Davis
 President in: Convention by Fletcher Knebel (1964 novel).
 Davis does not run for re-election due to ill health.

President Gordon Davis
 President in: Protect and Defend by Eric L. Harry
 Davis was an African-American Senator from Maryland prior to his nomination as Governor Phil Bristol's running-mate. Davis is wounded in the assassination of President-elect Bristol and later sworn in from his hospital room. He presides over a war between China and U.N. forces over control of Siberia.
 Party: Republican

President Jack Davis
 President in: Revolution
 Former United States Secretary of Defense
 Evacuated to Guantanamo Bay Naval Base six months after the blackout
 Davis has the vice president assassinated in order to become president, as the president, the Speaker of the United States House of Representatives and everyone else ahead of him died in the crash of Air Force One when the blackout hit, to fulfill his goals of reshaping the United States in his own image.
 Killed by Charlie Matheson in the comic series

President Browning Dayton
 President at the end of: The Zero Factor by William Oscar Johnson (1980 novel)
 Dayton is the Vice President to Augustus Alvin York, a Republican nominated in Chicago as the candidate for president when the convention for the 1980 election is hopelessly deadlocked with Ronald Reagan and other nominees. After dozens of ballots, York is a compromise/sacrificial nomination.
 York wins the 1980 election, but then becomes rather obsessed with the Zero Factor for presidents, where all presidents elected in a year ending in Zero since 1840 have died in office. York fears he will be next in 1980. After multiple attempts on his life, York suffers severe stress, and finds freedom from the Zero Factor by resigning and turning the presidency over to Browning Dayton.
Party: Republican

President Hamilton "Ham" Delbacher
 President in: The Hill of Summer and The Roads of Earth
 Sitting Vice President, on the verge of being asked to leave the coming year's ticket, who succeeds to the presidency after his unnamed predecessor dies on the Fourth of July.
 Despite enormous personal criticism at home and abroad, he defies plans by Yuri Serapin, the dictator of the Soviet Union, to undermine the west.
 Delbacher survives an assassination attempt by a false KGB defector inside the White House.
 He presides over the disintegration of the Soviet Union, but is disappointed when the People's Republic of China begins assimilating Soviet Asian territory, including Siberia.

President Jarrod Delport
 President in: The American Hero and The Word of Hate by Josh Gurling
 Senior Senator from New York (2028–2036) and later Vice President (2036–2040)
 He wins the election in 2036 as Dean Bartlett's running mate
 Becomes the first foreign-born U.S. vice president, and later president, when the 34th Amendment is passed, allowing him to run.
 Elected as president in 2040 and serves until 2048
 Delport chooses Edward "Ed" Garcia as his running mate.
 Married to former Governor of California's daughter Alexandra Buchanan
 Works alongside Louis Laurént, the Prime Minister of Canada to create a loose American Federation.
 Political party: Democratic

President Jack Decker
 President in: Decker
 Dies on July 4. 2076.

President Demsky
 President in: Alien Apocalypse (2005 film)
 President Demsky escapes Washington, D.C., before it was destroyed by alien invaders.
 Seen as a mythic figure leading the resistance to the invaders, Demsky is found by astronauts who have returned to Earth, in hiding with other former government officials and with no interest in fighting.
 Inspired by the astronauts, Demsky joins them in beginning an actual resistance.
 Played by: Peter Jason
 Party: Republican

President Dennings
 President in: "Time Angels" (NTSF:SD:SUV::).
 First female president
 Her husband is killed in 1975 by time travelers in an attempt to prevent the birth of her nuclear terrorist disk jockey son.
 Taken back in time to confront time villain Leonardo da Vinci
 Killed by time travelers before she becomes president to prevent the nuclear destruction of San Diego in the future.
 Played by: Tara Copeland

President Tom Dering
 President in: Justin Richards' novels Doctor Who: Option Lock and Doctor Who: Millennium Shock
 Dering's running mate was Jack Michaels; Dering defeats Bill Clinton in the 1996 presidential election.

President Deutscher
 President in: A Sound of Thunder by Ray Bradbury
 A fascist candidate who in the "original" timeline was defeated in 2055 by the more moderate Keith, but becomes the president in an alternate timeline when a time traveler steps on a butterfly and caused a wave of historical changes.

President Devlin
 President in: Spy Kids 3-D: Game Over
 Played by: George Clooney
 Devlin appeared in the first Spy Kids film, but he was not president then. Spy Kids 2: The Island of Lost Dreams featured an unnamed president played by Christopher McDonald.

President Devonian
 Former president referenced in Thank You for Smoking by Christopher Buckley.

President DeVore
 President in: Crisis
 His teenage son is kidnapped along with the students of Ballard High School, attended by the children of Washington, D.C.'s elite.
 Portrayed by: John Allen Nelson

President Dexter
 President in: Saturday Night Live
 During his first term, a crisis occurs because he had mustard on his chin. In his second term, it is revealed that he is illiterate.
 Played by: Charlton Heston

President Isabel Diaz
 President in: Born to Run, The Trusted, and The Tao Deception by John M. Green
 First woman to win the White House, and first Hispanic.
 Party: Republican, with a Democrat vice-president.

President Robert Diaz
 President on: The Blacklist
 Played by: Benito Martinez
 While running for election, he kills a teenager in a drunk driving accident. Desperate, he accepts a large campaign donation of illicit money from corrupt businessman Alexander Kirk to hire a professional cleaner.
 He is blackmailed over accepting Kirk's dirty money by Raymond Reddington into providing a full pardon to Elizabeth Keen over her killing of the corrupt Attorney General.
 While preparing for re-election, his wife begs him to publicly confess to the death of the teenager. Diaz conspires with his Chief of Staff Ana McMahon to have the First Lady assassinated by a Secret Service agent.
 Reddington and the Blacklist task force intervene to save the First Lady and expose Diaz's crimes, leading to his downfall and arrest.

President C. Douglas Dillion
 President in: Resurrection Day by Brendan Dubois
 Secretary of the Treasury during the Cuban Missile Crisis, and is the highest ranking cabinet member to survive the nuclear exchange.
 Party: Republican (although served in a Democratic Cabinet).

President Douglass Dilman
 President in: The Man
 First African-American President
 Previously served as President Pro Tempore of the United States Senate, a position he was given as a form of tokenism
 Succeeds to the presidency after President Fenton and the Speaker of the House are killed in an accident in Frankfurt, West Germany, and Vice President Noah Calvin refuses to assume the office due to poor health.
 Dilman is initially manipulated by Secretary of State Arthur Eaton, who wants to orchestrate Dilman's downfall to take his place.
 He oversees the criminal extradition of Robert Wheeler to South Africa for attempting to kill a politician there, which upsets his political activist daughter, Wanda.
 In the novel he decides not to run for re-election. In the film, he is last seen walking on stage at the national convention.
 Played by: James Earl Jones (film)

President Trick E. Dixon
 President in: Our Gang
 Parody of Richard Nixon inspired by Nixon's statement about his opposition to abortion based on his belief in "the sanctity of human life".

President Joe Doakes
 President in: Mathematicians in Love

President Mitchell Dobe
 President in: Not Even a Name by Henry I. Obdson
 Three-term Mayor of Boston, elected president as a U.S. Senator from New Hampshire. 
 Political party: Democratic

President John Doe aka Tempus
 President in: "Meet John Doe" and "Lois and Clarks" (Lois & Clark: The New Adventures of Superman)
 Played by: Lane Davies

President Joseph Donahue
 President in: Rides a Pale Horse by Franklin Allen Lieb.
 Former U.S. Senator from Connecticut and vice president under President Tolliver.
 Becomes president after Tolliver is assassinated.
 Donahue ends Tolliver's campaign against terrorist states, but the result is seen as weakness and a nuclear war nearly begins.

President Jack Donnelly
 President in: The KGB Candidate by Owen Sela (1988 novel)
 Elected in 1980, and re-elected in 1984.
 Strongly anti-Communist.
 Party: Republican

President Kevin J. Donnelly
 President in: The General's President by John Dalmas
 Native of Colorado.
 Served as vice president under President Wheeler, and takes over as president after Wheeler's death
 After a stock market crash in 1994 throws the United States and the rest of the world into turmoil, he works with the United States Congress to institute several emergency measures to combat growing unrest.
 Donnelly is left physically and emotionally drained during his time in office during the unrest, becoming so ill he has to be permanently accompanied by members of the Medical Corps. 
 Donnelly wanted to resign due to the stress, and chooses to appoint Chairman of the Joint Chiefs of Staff General Thomas M. "Jumper" Cromwell as vice president to succeed him, having forced the previous vice president's resignation after a scandal. Cromwell recommends Donnelly appoint Arne Haugen to take over the office. Donnelly uses the emergency powers to appoint Haugen to the office of vice president without the need for congressional approval, and then immediately resigns, causing Haugen to ascend to the office of the president.
 After his resignation, President Donnelly is taken to Bethesda Naval Hospital for treatment.

President Robert Donovan
 President in: The President's Man by Nicholas Guild (1982 novel)
 Vice president to President Faircliffe, and becomes president when Faircliffe dies in office.
 Donovan is later informed that Faircliffe was a traitor.

President Victor von Doom

 President in issues 29-33 of Doom 2099, and other Marvel 2099 titles.
 Dictator of the fictional country Latveria, Doom arrives in the year 2099. Seeing the damage being done to the world by American mega-corporations, Doom invades America and installs himself as president by "right of revolution".

President Jonathan Doors
 President in: Earth: Final Conflict
 He is president in an illusion created by aliens.

President Douchebag
 President in: Stewie Griffin: The Untold Story
 His two-term presidency caused the meaning of the word "douchebag" to change. His opponent is identified as Senator Daterape.

President Matt Douglas
 President in: My Fellow Americans
 Former governor of Indiana
Douglas runs against Senator Russell P. Kramer of Ohio and loses, but he defeats Kramer four years later in a landslide. Douglas is later defeated by Kramer's vice president, William Haney. Douglas later ran again for office as an independent alongside Kramer. He has a reputation as a womanizer and is married to Katherine Douglas.
 Played by: James Garner
 Party: Independent, formerly Democratic

President Thomas Douglas
 President in: The Puppet Masters
 Played by: Tom Mason

President Ilene Dover
 President in: Hunter Killer
 First female president
 She oversees a US naval operation to rescue the kidnapped President of Russia.
 Played by: Caroline Goodall

President Arthur Downing
 President in: President of the North American Confederacy in The Probability Broach, as part of the North American Confederacy Series by L. Neil Smith, in which the United States becomes a Libertarian state after a successful Whiskey Rebellion and George Washington being overthrown and executed by firing squad for treason in 1794.
 Serves as the twelfth president from 1856 to 1859.
 Dies in office in 1859. He is the fifth president to die or be killed while in office after George Washington, Thomas Jefferson, James Monroe, and Sequoyah Guess.
 Succeeded by Harriet Beecher Stowe, who serves from 1859 to 1860.

President Connor Doyle
 President in: The People's Choice by Jeff Greenfield.
 He is chosen by the voters after President-Elect MacArthur Foyle's death.
 Former U.S. Congressman
 Party: Republican

President Howard T. Duck
 President on Earth-65 in the Marvel Universe
 A human based on Howard the Duck

President Michael Dugan
 President in: Command & Conquer: Red Alert 2 and Command & Conquer: Yuri's Revenge
 He leads the nation during a Soviet invasion of the United States that ignites World War III. He is still president on June 30, 1972, when the first phase of the war ends.
 Played by: Ray Wise

President Michael Dukakis
 President in: Shadowrun
 Party: Democratic

President Jonathan Lincoln Duncan
 President in: The President is Missing

President Dunkelzahan 
 President in: Shadowrun
 Serves in 2057
 7th UCAS President | 53rd US President
 Dies in a limousine explosion 10 hours, 23 minutes, and 8 seconds after being sworn in as president
 Preceded by President Betty Jo Pritchard
 Succeeded by VP Kyle Haeffner

President Sam Dunne
 President in: Touched by an Angel
 Played by: David Hart

President Helen Du Pray
 President in: The Fourth K
 Vice President to President Francis Xavier Kennedy who is assassinated on Inauguration Day of his second term.

President Charles Carter Durant
 President in: Earth II
 Played by: Lew Ayres

President Vanessa Durksen
 President in: Red Planet Blues by Robert J. Sawyer
 Her body is fatally shot by a crazed gunman during her second term, but her mind is uploaded to an artificial body, which serves for the remainder of the term.
 She is the subject of the fictional Supreme Court case Durksen v. Hawksorth, which established that legal personhood is transferred to an artificial body when consciousness is transferred.

President Roger Durling
 President in: Debt of Honor
 Former Governor of California, he succeeds to the presidency after his predecessor resigns.
 Served in Vietnam with the 82nd Airborne Division.
 Appoints Jack Ryan as his vice president, before being killed in a terrorist attack on the Capitol.

References

Lists of fictional presidents of the United States